There is approximately 350 genera within the family Encyrtidae (Apocrita, Hymenoptera). There are two subfamilies: Encyrtinae and Tetracneminae.

 subfamily Encyrtinae Walker 1837
Acerophagus Smith 1880
Achalcerinys Girault 1915
Adelencyrtoides Tachikawa & Valentine 1969
Adelencyrtus Ashmead 1900
Adencyrtus Prinsloo 1977
Admirencyrtus Hoffer 1960
Aenasiella Girault 1914
Aenasomyiella Girault 1915
Aesaria Noyes & Woolley 1994
Aethognathus Silvestri 1915
Agarwalencyrtus Hayat 1981
Agekianella Trjapitzin 1981
Ageniaspis Dahlbom 1857
Agromyzaphagus Gahan 1912
Allencyrtus Annecke & Mynhardt 1973
Allocerchysius Hoffer 1963
Aloencyrtus Prinsloo 1978
Amauroencyrtus De Santis 1985
Ameromyzobia Girault 1916
Amicencyrtus Hayat 1981
Amicroterys Myartseva 1983
Amira Girault 1913
Ammonoencyrtus De Santis 1964
Anagyrodes Girault 1915
Anasemion Annecke 1967
Andinoencyrtus Blanchard 1940
Anicetus Howard 1896
Anisophleps Fidalgo 1981
Anthemus Howard 1896
Aphidencyrtoides Ishii 1928
Aphycinus Trjapitzin 1962
Aphycoides Mercet 1921
Aphycomastix De Santis 1972
Aphycomorpha Timberlake 1919
Aphycopsis Timberlake 1916
Aphyculus Hoffer 1954
Aphycus Mayr 1876
Apsilophrys De Santis 1964
Archinus Howard 1897
Argutencyrtus Prinsloo & Annecke 1974
Arhopoidiella Noyes 1980
Arrhenophagoidea Girault 1915
Arrhenophagus Aurivillius 1888
Arzonella Pagliano & Scaramozzino 1990
Aschitus Mercet 1921
Aseirba Cameron 1884
Asterolecanobius Tachikawa 1963
Astymachus Howard 1898
Atelaphycus Blanchard 1940
Atropates Howard 1898
Australanusia Girault 1922
Australaphycus Girault 1923
Austrochoreia Girault 1929
Austroencyrtoidea Girault 1922
Austroencyrtus Girault 1923
Austromira Girault 1924
Avetianella Trjapitzin 1968
Aztecencyrtus Timberlake 1926
Baeoanusia Girault 1915
Baeocharis Mayr 1876
Baeoencyrtus De Santis 1964
Beethovena Girault 1932
Bennettisca Noyes 1980
Blanchardiscus De Santis 1964
Blastothrix Mayr 1876
Blatticidella Gahan & Fagan 1923
Bolangera Hayat & Noyes 1986
Borrowella Girault 1923
Bothriocraera Timberlake 1916
Bothriophryne Compere 1937
Bothriothorax Ratzeburg 1844
Boucekiella Hoffer 1954
Brachyencyrtus Hoffer 1959
Brachyplatycerus De Santis 1972
Brethesiella Timberlake 1920
Caenohomalopoda Tachikawa 1979
Caldencyrtus Noyes & Hanson 1996
Carabunia Waterston 1928
Casus Noyes & Woolley 1994
Ceballosia Mercet 1921
Centencyrtus Noyes & Woolley 1994
Cerapteroceroides Ashmead 1904
Cerapterocerus Westwood 1833
Ceraptroceroideus Girault 1916
Cerchysiella Girault 1914
Cerchysius Westwood 1832
Cercobelus Walker 1842
Charitopsis Trjapitzin 1969
Cheiloneurella Girault 1915
Cheiloneuromyia Girault 1915
Cheiloneurus Westwood 1833
Cheilopsis Prinsloo 1983
Choreia Westwood 1833
Chrysomelechthrus Trjapitzin 1977
Cibdeloencyrtus De Santis 1964
Cicoencyrtus Noyes 1980
Cirrhencyrtus Timberlake 1918
Coagerus Noyes & Hayat 1984
Coccidaphycus Blanchard 1940
Coccidencyrtus Ashmead 1900
Coccidoctonus Crawford 1912
Coccopilatus Annecke 1963
Coelopencyrtus Timberlake 1919
Comones Noyes & Woolley 1994
Comperia Gomes 1942
Comperiella Howard 1906
Conchynilla Girault 1923
Copidosoma Ratzeburg 1844
Copidosomopsis Girault 1915
Copidosomyia Girault 1915
Cowperia Girault 1919
Cyderius Noyes 1980
Deilio Noyes & Woolley 1994
Deloencyrtus De Santis 1967
Diaphorencyrtus Hayat 1981
Diasula Noyes & Hayat 1984
Dionencyrtus De Santis 1985
Discodes Förster 1856
Diversinervus Silvestri 1915
Doddanusia Noyes & Hayat 1984
Ebito Noyes & Woolley 1994
Echthrobaccella Girault 1915
Echthrogonatopus Perkins 1906
Echthroplexiella Mercet 1921
Echthroplexis Förster 1856
Ectroma Westwood 1833
Encyrtoalces De Santis 1985
Encyrtoidea Girault 1923
Encyrtus Latreille 1809
Epiblatticida Girault 1915
Epicerchysius Girault 1915
Epiencyrtus Ashmead 1900
Epistenoterys Girault 1915
Epitetracnemus Girault 1915
Epitetralophidea Girault 1915
Eremencyrtus Trjapitzin 1972
Erencyrtus Mahdihassan 1923
Ethoris Noyes & Hayat 1984
Eucoccidophagus Hoffer 1963
Eugahania Mercet 1926
Euogus Noyes & Woolley 1994
Eupoecilopoda Novicky & Hoffer 1953
Euscapularia Hoffer 1976
Eusemion Dahlbom 1857
Exoristobia Ashmead 1904
Forcipestricis Burks 1968
Formicencyrtus Girault 1916
Fulgoridicida Perkins 1906
Gahaniella Timberlake 1926
Gentakola Noyes & Hayat 1984
Ginsiana Erdös & Novicky 1955
Globulencyrtus Hoffer 1976
Gonzalezia De Santis 1964
Grissellia Noyes 1980
Gwala Noyes & Woolley 1994
Habrolepis Förster 1856
Habrolepoidea Howard 1894
Habrolepopteryx Ashmead 1900
Hadrencyrtus Annecke & Mynhardt 1973
Hadzhibeylia Myartseva & Trjapitzin 1981
Haligra Noyes & Hayat 1984
Helegonatopus Perkins 1906
Helygia Noyes & Woolley 1994
Hemencyrtus Ashmead 1900
Hemileucoceras Hoffer 1976
Hengata Noyes & Hayat 1984
Hesperencyrtus Annecke 1971
Heterococcidoxenus Ishii 1940
Hexacladia Ashmead 1891
Hexacnemus Timberlake 1926
Hexencyrtus Girault 1915
Homalopoda Howard 1894
Homalotyloidea Mercet 1921
Homalotylus Mayr 1876
Homosemion Annecke 1967
Hoplopsis De Stefani 1889
Hypergonatopus Timberlake 1922
Iceromyia Noyes 1980
Ilicia Mercet 1921
Indaphycus Hayat 1981
Ioessa Erdös 1955
Islawes Noyes & Woolley 1994
Isodromoides Girault 1914
Isodromus Howard 1887
Ixodiphagus Howard 1907
Kataka Noyes & Hayat 1984
Koenigsmannia Trjapitzin 1982
Kurdjumovia Trjapitzin 1977
Laccacida Prinsloo 1977
Lakshaphagus Mahdihassan 1931
Lamennaisia Girault 1922
Leefmansia Waterston 1928
Leiocyrtus Erdös & Novicky 1955
Leurocerus Crawford 1911
Lirencyrtus Noyes 1980
Lochitoencyrtus De Santis 1964
Lohiella Noyes 1980
Lombitsikala Risbec 1957
Mahencyrtus Masi 1917
Manmohanencyrtus Singh 1995
Mariola Noyes 1980
Mashhoodiella Hayat 1972
Mayrencyrtus Hincks 1944
Mayridia Mercet 1921
Melys Noyes & Woolley 1994
Meniscocephalus Perkins 1906
Merlen Noyes & Woolley 1994
Meromyzobia Ashmead 1900
Mesanusia Girault 1922
Mesastymachus Girault 1923
Mesocalocerinus Girault 1922
Mesorhopella Girault 1923
Metablastothrix Sugonjaev 1964
Metanotalia Mercet 1921
Metaphycus Mercet 1917
Metapsyllaephagus Myartseva 1980
Microterys Thomson 1876
Moorella Cameron 1913
Mozartella Girault 1926
Mucrencyrtus Noyes 1980
Muluencyrtus Noyes & Hayat 1984
Nassauia Girault 1932
Nathismusia Noyes & Hayat 1984
Neabrolepoideus Girault 1917
Neapsilophrys Noyes 1980
Neastymachus Girault 1915
Neblatticida Girault 1915
Negeniaspidius Trjapitzin 1982
Neocladella Girault 1915
Neocladia Perkins 1906
Neococcidencyrtus Compere 1928
Neocyrtus Trjapitzin 1985
Nerissa Trjapitzin 1977
Nezarhopalus Girault 1915
Oesol Noyes & Woolley 1994
Olypusa Noyes & Hayat 1984
Oobius Trjapitzin 1963
Ooencyrtus Ashmead 1900
Oophagus Liao 1987
Orianos Noyes 1990
Oriencyrtus Sugonjaev & Trjapitzin 1974
Ovaloencyrtus Noyes & Hayat 1984
Ovidoencyrtus Girault 1924
Paksimmondsius Ahmad & Ghani 1974
Papaka Noyes 1980
Papuna Noyes & Hayat 1984
Parablastothrix Mercet 1917
Parablatticida Girault 1915
Parachalcerinys Girault 1925
Paracladella Girault 1920
Paraenasomyia Girault 1915
Paramucrona Noyes 1980
Paraphaenodiscus Girault 1915
Paraphycus Girault 1915
Parasauleia Hoffer 1968
Paraschedius Mercet 1925
Parastenoterys Girault 1915
Paratetracnemoidea Girault 1915
Paratetralophidea Girault 1915
Parechthrodryinus Girault 1916
Parectromoides Girault 1915
Parencyrtomyia Girault 1915
Parencyrtus Ashmead 1900
Pareupelmus Kryger 1951
Pareusemion Ishii 1925
Pasulinia Noyes & Hayat 1984
Pawenus Noyes & Woolley 1994
Pentacladocerus Erdös 1963
Pentelicus Howard 1895
Perpolia Noyes & Woolley 1994
Phauloencyrtus Girault 1940
Philosindia Noyes & Hayat 1984
Pistulina Hoffer 1976
Plagiomerus Crawford 1910
Platencyrtus Ferrière 1955
Prionomastix Mayr 1876
Prionomitoides Girault 1915
Prionomitus Mayr 1876
Prochiloneurus Silvestri 1915
Proleuroceroides Shafee, Alam & Agarwal 1975
Proleurocerus Ferrière 1935
Protyndarichoides Noyes 1980
Pseudaphycus Clausen 1915
Pseudectroma Girault 1915
Pseudencyrtoides Gordh & Trjapitzin 1975
Pseudencyrtus Ashmead 1900
Pseudhomalopoda Girault 1915
Pseudococcobius Timberlake 1916
Pseudorhopus Timberlake 1926
Psilophryoidea Compere 1928
Psilophrys Mayr 1876
Psyllaephagus Ashmead 1900
Psyllaphycus Hayat 1972
Psyllechthrus Ghesquière 1958
Pulexencyrtus Noyes & Woolley 1994
Quadrencyrtus Hoffer 1952
Raffaellia Girault 1922
Rhopalencyrtoidea Girault 1915
Rhytidothorax Ashmead 1900
Ruandella Risbec 1957
Ruskiniana Girault 1923
Saera Noyes & Woolley 1994
Sanghalia Risbec 1955
Saprencyrtus Noyes & Hayat 1984
Sarisencyrtus Noyes & Woolley 1994
Satureia Noyes & Woolley 1994
Sauleia Sugonjaev 1964
Scotteus Masi 1917
Sectiliclava Hoffer 1957
Semen Hoffer 1954
Shenahetia Noyes 1980
Simmondsiella Noyes 1980
Solenaphycus De Santis 1972
Solenoencyrtus De Santis 1964
Spaniopterus Gahan 1927
Stemmatosteres Timberlake 1918
Stenoteropsis Girault 1915
Subprionomitus Mercet 1921
Syrphophagus Ashmead 1900
Szelenyiola Trjapitzin 1977
Tachardiaephagus Ashmead 1904
Tachardiobius Timberlake 1926
Tachinaephagus Ashmead 1904
Tanyencyrtus De Santis 1972
Tassonia Girault 1921
Teleterebratus Compere & Zinna 1955
Tetarticlava Noyes 1980
Tetracyclos Kryger 1942
Thomsonisca Ghesquière 1946
Tineophoctonus Ashmead 1900
Tobiasia Trjapitzin 1962
Trechnites Thomson 1876
Tremblaya Trjapitzin 1985
Trichomasthus Thomson 1876
Trigonogaster Guérin-Méneville 1844
Trjapitzinellus Viggiani 1967
Tyndarichus Howard 1910
Tyndaricopsis Gordh & Trjapitzin 1981
Vietmachus Sugonjaev 1995
Viggianiola Trjapitzin 1982
Whittieria Girault 1938
Xenoencyrtus Riek 1962
Xenostryxis Girault 1920
Xerencyrtus Trjapitzin 1972
Xylencyrtus Annecke 1968
Zaomma Ashmead 1900
Zaommoencyrtus Girault 1916
Zarhopaloides Girault 1915
Zelaphycus Noyes 1988
Zelencyrtus Noyes 1988
Zooencyrtus Girault 1915
Zozoros Noyes & Hayat 1984

subfamily Tetracneminae Howard 1892
Acerophagoides Blanchard 1940
Adektitopus Noyes & Hayat 1984
Aenasius Walker 1846
Aeptencyrtus De Santis 1964
Aglyptus Förster 1856
Alamella Agarwal 1966
Allocerellus Silvestri 1915
Amasyxia Noyes 2000
Ameniscocephalus Girault 1915
Anagyrietta Ferrière 1955
Anagyrus Howard 1896
Ananusia Girault 1917
Anomalencyrtus Hayat & Verma 1980
Anomalicornia Mercet 1921
Anusia Förster 1856
Anusioptera Brues 1910
Apoleptomastix Kerrich 1982
Aquaencyrtus Hoffer 1952
Asencyrtus Trjapitzin 1972
Asitus Erdös 1955
Avernes Noyes & Woolley 1994
Bactritopus Trjapitzin 1989
Blepyrus Howard 1898
Bureshiella Hoffer 1983
Callaincyrtus Prinsloo & Annecke 1979
Callipteroma Motschulsky 1863
Ceraptrocerella Girault 1918
Charitopus Förster 1856
Chrysoplatycerus Ashmead 1889
Cladiscodes Subba Rao 1977
Clausenia Ishii 1923
Coccidoxenoides Girault 1915
Cryptanusia Girault 1917
Cryptoplatycerus Trjapitzin 1982
Cyrtocoryphes Timberlake 1926
Dicarnosis Mercet 1921
Dinocarsiella Mercet 1921
Dinocarsis Förster 1856
Dusmetia Mercet 1921
Ectromatopsis Compere 1947
Eotopus Noyes & Hayat 1984
Epanusia Girault 1913
Eremophasma Sugonjaev & Trjapitzin 1979
Ericydnus Haliday 1832
Euzkadiella Mercet 1922
Extencyrtus Noyes & Woolley 1994
Gafsa Thuroczy & Trjapitzin 1990
Gavria Noyes 2000
Gyranusoidea Compere 1947
Hambletonia Compere 1936
Hipponactis Noyes 2000
Hofferencyrtus Boucek 1977
Holanusomyia Girault 1915
Holcencyrtus Ashmead 1900
Incisencyrtus Prinsloo 1988
Leptomastidea Mercet 1916
Leptomastix Förster 1856
Lutherisca Ghesquière 1946
Lyka Mercet 1921
Manicnemus Hayat 1981
Marxella Girault 1932
Mashhoodia Shafee 1972
Metaphaenodiscus Mercet 1921
Mira Schellenberg 1803
Mohelencyrtus Hoffer 1969
Mohelniella Hoffer 1964
Monodiscodes Hoffer 1953
Monstranusia Trjapitzin 1964
Moraviella Hoffer 1954
Neocharitopus Hayat, Alam & Agarwal 1975
Neodusmetia Kerrich 1964
Neoplatycerus Subba Rao 1965
Neorhopus Girault 1917
Nesebaria Hoffer 1970
Notodusmetia Noyes 1988
Odiaglyptus Noyes 1988
Paraclausenia Hayat 1980
Paracopidosoma Hoffer 1957
Paraenasioidea Hoffer 1953
Paramasia Hoffer 1953
Paranathrix Myartseva 1980
Parapyrus Noyes 1984
Parectromoidella Girault 1915
Pelmatencyrtus De Santis 1964
Peneax Noyes 2000
Phasmocephalon Trjapitzin 1977
Phasmocera Trjapitzin 1971
Phasmopoda Trjapitzin 1977
Praleurocerus Agarwal 1974
Pseudleptomastix Girault 1915
Rhopus Förster 1856
Ruanderoma Noyes & Hayat 1984
Sakencyrtus Hayat 1981
Savzdargia Trjapitzin 1979
Schilleriella Ghesquière 1946
Taftia Ashmead 1904
Tetracnemoidea Howard 1898
Tetracnemus Westwood 1837
Tricnemus Mercet 1921
Tropidophryne Compere 1931
Vosleria Timberlake 1926
Xanthoectroma Mercet 1925
Xenanusia Girault 1917
Yasumatsuiola Trjapitzin 1977
Zaplatycerus Timberlake 1925
Zarhopalus Ashmead 1900

References 

Encyrtid genera
Genera